Blue Note Hawaii is a jazz club in Waikiki, Honolulu, Hawaii. It is a part of the Blue Note chain. It opened on January 14, 2016, with Kenny G and Jake Shimabukuro performing for several days. It features live jazz and blues music and also popular Hawaiian musical artists. It is located in the Outrigger Waikiki Beach Resort. Broadway World calls it "the state's premier venue for the world's most celebrated artists".

References

External links 
 

Jazz clubs in the United States
Music venues in Hawaii
Buildings and structures in Honolulu
Waikiki
2016 establishments in Hawaii